Thomas Dixon may refer to:

 Thomas Dixon (nonconformist) (died 1754), English minister and tutor
 Thomas Dixon (architect) (died 1886), Baltimore architect
 Thomas C. Dixon (died 1870s), hatter and political figure in Canada West
 Thomas Hill Dixon (1816–1880), superintendent of convicts in Western Australia
 Thomas Dixon (South African cricketer) (1847–1915)
 Thomas Dixon Jr. (1864–1946), American lecturer who wrote the novel made into Birth of a Nation
 Sir Thomas Dixon, 2nd Baronet (1868–1950), Northern Ireland politician
 Thomas Dixon (Irish cricketer) (1906–1985)
 Thomas Dixon Centre, built 1908, performing arts venue in Australia
 Thomas Sidney Dixon (1916–1993), involved in the Max Stuart case, a trial for murder in Australia

See also
 Thomas Dickson (disambiguation)
 Tom Dixon (disambiguation)
 Thomas Homer-Dixon (born 1956), Canadian political scientist